The Progressive Conservative Party of Manitoba fielded fifty-six candidates in the 2007 Manitoba provincial election, and won 19 seats to remain as the Official Opposition party in the Legislative Assembly of Manitoba.  Many of the party's candidates have their own biography pages; information about others may be found here.

Candidates

Northern Manitoba/Parkland

Dauphin-Roblin: Lloyd McKinney
Flin Flon: no candidate
Rupertsland: David Harper
Swan River: Maxine Plesiuk
The Pas: George Muswaggon
Thompson: Cory Phillips

Westman
Arthur-Virden: Larry Maguire
Brandon East: Drew Caldwell
Brandon West: Rick Borotsik
Minnedosa: Leanne Rowat
Russell: Len Derkach

Central Manitoba
Carman: Blaine Pedersen
Gimli: Chris Bourgeois
Interlake: Garry Wasylowski
Lakeside: Ralph Eichler
Morris: Mavis Taillieu
Pembina: Peter Dyck
Portage la Prairie: David Faurschou 
Selkirk: Gordie Dehn
Ste. Rose: Stu Briese
Turtle Mountain: Cliff Cullen

Eastman

Emerson: Cliff Graydon
Lac du Bonnet: Gerald Hawranik
La Verendrye: Bob Stefaniuk
Springfield: Ron Schuler
Steinbach: Kelvin Goertzen

Northwest Winnipeg
Burrows: Rick Negrych
Inkster: Roger Bennett
Kildonan: Brent Olynyk
Point Douglas: Alexa Rosentreter
St. Johns: Tim Hooper
The Maples: Lou Fernandez
Wellington: José Tomas

Northeast Winnipeg
Concordia: Ken Waddell
Elmwood: Allister Carrington
Radisson: Linda West
River East: Bonnie Mitchelson
Rossmere: Cathy Cox
St. Boniface: Jennifer Tarrant 
Transcona: Bryan McLeod

West Winnipeg
Assiniboia: Kelly de Groot
Charleswood: Myrna Driedger
Kirkfield Park: Chris Kozier
St. James: Kristine McGhee
Tuxedo: Heather Stefanson 3,982 (47.07%)

Central Winnipeg
Fort Rouge: Christine Waddell
Lord Roberts: Wilf Makus
Minto: Kenny Daodu
River Heights: Ashley Burner
Wolseley: Gustav Nelson

South Winnipeg
Fort Garry: Shaun McCaffrey 2,101 (25.75%)
Fort Whyte: Hugh McFadyen
Riel: Trudy Turner
Seine River: Steven Andjelic
Southdale: Jack Reimer
St. Norbert: Tara Brousseau
St. Vital: Grant Cooper

2007